nVidia introduced the Video Processing Engine or VPE with the GeForce 4 MX.  It is a feature of nVidia's GeForce graphics processor line that offers dedicated hardware to offload parts of the MPEG2 decoding and encoding.  The GeForce Go FX 5700 rolled out the VPE 3.0.  The VPE later developed into nVidia's PureVideo.

VPE 1 
hardware MPEG2 decoding,
inverse quantization (IQ)
inverse discrete cosine transform (IDCT)
motion compensation
colour space conversion (CSC) functions
hardware subpicture alpha blending
Adaptive De-interlacing
5 Horizontal x 3 Vertical Taps Scaling & Filtering
Independent Hardware Color Enhancements and Digital Vibrance Control
Component out supporting 720i and 1080i
master sync generator to control the sync levels
interlacer to output 480i and 1080i interlaced modes and a TV encoder, which operates in digital-to-analogue converter (DAC) mode with Tri Level Sync. VPE supports the first two of these element and all that is required to ship a graphics board capable of YPrPb output is a TV encoder that supports tri-level sync, and to replace the 4-Pin S-Video connector with a 9 pin.
geforce 4 420/440 go

VPE 2 
GeForce FX Go 5650, 5600, 5200, and 5100 models
Video Mixing Renderer (vmr)
MPEG-2 decode engine
adaptive deinterlacing
dedicated independent gamma correction
MPEG-2 encode assist
Digital Vibrance Control

VPE 3.0
Component High Definition component out
MPEG-2 video decode engine suitable for DVD playback, HDTV decode, and decoding streaming video up to 1920x1080
Adaptive de-interlacing
Independent and dedicated gamma correcting 
enhanced scaling, filtering, sharpening
MPEG-2 encode
Video Mixing Renderer (VMR) allows integration of video with other 2d and 3d windows
Digital Vibrance Control 3
Inverse Quantization
Inverse Discrete Cosine Transformation
Motion Compensation
Colorspace Conversion
subpicture alpha blending
Scaling engine
dithering circuit

Operating system support 
The VPE SIP core needs to be supported by the device driver. The device driver provides one or multiple interfaces, like e.g. VDPAU, VAAPI or DXVA. One of this interfaces is then used by end-user software, like e.g. VLC media player or GStreamer, to access the VPE hardware and make use of it.

Nvidia's proprietary device driver is available for multiple operating systems and support for VPE has been added to it. Additionally, a free device driver named nouveau is available. This driver also supports the VPE hardware.

See also
 GeForce 256's Motion Compensation
 High-Definition Video Processor
 PureVideo

References

Nvidia IP cores
Video acceleration